The 1956–57 Allsvenskan was the 23rd season of the top division of Swedish handball. 10 teams competed in the league. Örebro SK won the league and claimed their second Swedish title. Majornas IK and Ystads IF were relegated.

League table

References 

Swedish handball competitions